Jascha Zayde (October 25, 1911 – September 3, 1999) was an American pianist, composer, and conductor. From the 1930s, he was the first staff musician hired by WQXR. From 1954, he was the staff keyboard player of the New York City Ballet.

Notes

External links
 Jascha Zayde playing pieces by 
 Jascha Zayde's recording of 
 Jascha Zayde's and John Strauss's recording of Strauss's 
 Jascha Zayde's recordings of 

American male classical composers
American classical composers
American classical pianists
Male classical pianists
American male pianists
American male conductors (music)
1911 births
1999 deaths
20th-century American conductors (music)
20th-century classical composers
20th-century classical pianists
20th-century American pianists
20th-century American composers
20th-century American male musicians